Antonio García Navajas (born 8 March 1958) is a Spanish former footballer who played as a defender.

Club career
Born in Posadas, Province of Córdoba, García Navajas appeared in 210 La Liga matches over ten seasons, in representation of Burgos CF, Real Madrid and Real Valladolid. Whilst with the second club, he won the 1979–80 national championship, but only contributed five matches to the feat. Additionally, he made ten appearances in the European Cup in two separate editions.

García Navajas retired in 1988 at the age of 30, after one season in Segunda División with Rayo Vallecano and another in the lower leagues with CP Almería.

International career
On 14 November 1979, García Navajas won his sole cap for the Spain national team, playing the full 90 minutes in a 1–3 friendly loss against Denmark at the Estadio Ramón de Carranza in Cádiz.

Honours
Real Madrid
La Liga: 1979–80
Copa del Rey: 1979–80, 1981–82

Valladolid
Copa de la Liga: 1984

References

External links

1958 births
Living people
Sportspeople from the Province of Córdoba (Spain)
Spanish footballers
Footballers from Andalusia
Association football defenders
La Liga players
Segunda División players
Segunda División B players
Burgos CF (1936) footballers
Real Madrid CF players
Real Valladolid players
Rayo Vallecano players
CP Almería players
Spain youth international footballers
Spain under-21 international footballers
Spain under-23 international footballers
Spain amateur international footballers
Spain international footballers